Shear forming, also referred as shear spinning, is similar to metal spinning. In shear spinning  the area of the final piece is approximately equal to that of the flat sheet metal blank. The wall thickness is maintained by controlling the gap between the roller and the mandrel. In shear forming a reduction of the wall thickness occurs.

Before the 1950s, spinning was performed on a simple turning lathe. When new technologies were introduced to the field of metal spinning and powered dedicated spinning machines were available, shear forming started its development in Sweden.

Schematics 

Figure 2 shows the schematics of a shear forming process.

1. A sheet metal blank is placed between the mandrel and the chuck of the spinning machine. The mandrel has the interior shape of the desired final component.

2. A roller makes the sheet metal wrap the mandrel so that it takes its shape.

As can be seen, s1 which is the initial wall thickness of the workpiece is reduced to s0.

Workpiece and roller tool profiles 

In shear forming, the starting workpiece can have circular or rectangular cross sections. On the other hand, the profile shape of the final component can be concave, convex or a combination of these two.

A shear-forming machine looks very much like a conventional spinning machine, except that it has to be much more robust to withstand the higher forces necessary to perform the shearing operation.

The design of the roller must be considered carefully, because it affects the shape of the component, the wall thickness, and dimensional accuracy. The smaller the tool nose radius, the higher the stresses and poorest thickness uniformity achieved.

Spinnability 

Spinnability, sometimes referred as shear spinnability, can be defined as the ability of a metal to undergo shear spinning deformation without exceeding its tensile strength and tearing. Published work on spinnability is available from the authors Kegg and Kalpakcioglu.

Kegg predicted that for materials with a tensile reduction of 80%, the limiting spinning reduction will be equal or greater than 80%. 
Kalpakciouglu  concluded that for metals with a true fracture strain of 0.5 or greater, there is a maximum limit for the shear forming reduction. For materials with a true strain below 0.5, the spinnability depends on the ductility of the material.

Highly spinnable materials include ductile materials like aluminum and certain steel alloys.

Importance of shear forming operations in manufacturing 

Shear forming and conventional spinning are being  used less than other manufacturing processes such as deep drawing and ironing. Being able to achieve almost any shape, thin sectioned parts, makes spinning a versatile process used widely in the production of lightweight items. Other advantages of shear spinning include the good mechanical properties of the final item and a very good surface finish.

Typical components produced by mechanically powered spinning machines include rocket nose cones, gas turbine engine and dish aerials.

Flow forming
Flow Forming is an incremental metal-forming technique in which a disk or tube of metal is formed over a mandrel by one or more rollers using tremendous pressure. The roller deforms the workpiece, forcing it against the mandrel, both axially lengthening and radially thinning it. Since the pressure exerted by the roller is highly localized and the material is incrementally formed, often there is a net savings in energy in forming over drawing or ironing processes. However, these savings are often not realized because of the inherent difficulties in predicting the resulting deformation for a given roller path.  Flow forming subjects the workpiece to a great deal of friction and deformation.  These two factors may heat the workpiece to several hundred degrees if proper cooling fluid is not utilized.

Flow forming is often used to manufacture automobile wheels and can be used to draw a wheel to net width from a machined blank.

During flow forming, the workpiece is cold worked, changing its mechanical properties, so its strength becomes similar to that of forged metal.

References 

  3.  https://www.pmfind.com/benefits/flowforming-process-benefits-process

Further reading
C.C. Wong, T.A. Dean and J. Lin, A review of spinning, shear forming and flow forming processes, Int. J. Mach. Tools Manuf. 43 (2003), pp. 1419–1435
B. Avitzur, Handbook of Metal-Forming Processes, John Wiley and Sons, Inc., Canada, 1983.
R.L. Kegg, A new test method for determination of spinnability of metals, Transactions of the ASME, Journal of Engineering for Industry 83 (1961) 119–124.
S. Kalpakcioglu, A study of shear-spinnability of metals, Transactions of the ASME, Journal of Engineering for Industry 83 (1961) 478–483.
https://www.d2pmagazine.com/2019/10/09/flowforming-specialist-offers-unique-combination-of-metal-forming-processes/

https://www.d2pmagazine.com/2017/08/16/flowforming-offers-range-of-benefits-for-aerospace-applications/

External links
 Metal Forming Videos
 CNC Flow Forming Machinery and Parts Photos

Metal forming